Steffi Graf and Gabriela Sabatini defeated Larisa Savchenko and Natasha Zvereva in the final, 6–3, 1–6, 12–10 to win the ladies' doubles tennis title at the 1988 Wimbledon Championships. It was the first and only major doubles title for both.

Claudia Kohde-Kilsch and Helena Suková were the defending champions but did not compete.

Seeds

  Martina Navratilova /  Pam Shriver (third round)
 n/a
  Steffi Graf /  Gabriela Sabatini (champions)
  Lori McNeil /  Betsy Nagelsen (quarterfinals)
  Jana Novotná /  Catherine Suire (third round)
  Eva Pfaff /  Elizabeth Smylie (quarterfinals)
  Elise Burgin /  Robin White (first round)
  Katrina Adams /  Zina Garrison (semifinals)
  Rosalyn Fairbank /  Gigi Fernández (quarterfinals)
  Leila Meskhi /  Svetlana Parkhomenko (second round)
  Larisa Savchenko /  Natasha Zvereva (final)
  Hana Mandlíková /  Barbara Potter (second round)
  Chris Evert /  Wendy Turnbull (semifinals)
  Jo Durie /  Sharon Walsh-Pete (third round)
  Catarina Lindqvist /  Tine Scheuer-Larsen (third round)
  Isabelle Demongeot /  Nathalie Tauziat (third round)
  Manon Bollegraf /  Nicole Provis (third round)

Qualifying

Draw

Finals

Top half

Section 1

Section 2

Bottom half

Section 3

Section 4

References

External links

1988 Wimbledon Championships – Women's draws and results at the International Tennis Federation

Women's Doubles
Wimbledon Championship by year – Women's doubles
Wimbledon Championships
Wimbledon Championships